Drug Enforcement Unit (DEU) is a branch of the Royal Bahamas Police Force ( RBPF) entrusted with the enforcement of drug laws within the Bahamas and investigating all reports into the RBPF about drug trafficking. The DEU was formed in 1988 and has inside units such as the counter-narcotics strike force. The unit well known for conducting operations to rid agencies like the Royal Bahamas Defence Force and the RBPF of corruption.

It has conducted numerous operations with the American Drug Enforcement Administration.

See also
Law enforcement agency
Drug law

References

Law enforcement in the Caribbean
Crime in the Bahamas
Drugs in the Bahamas